The Borzna Regiment was one the territorial-administrative subdivisions of the Cossack Hetmanate. The regiment's capital was the city of Borzna, now in Chernihiv Oblast of northern Ukraine.

Regiment was raised by colonel Petro Zabila on territory of Borzna Volost in 1648, during Khmelnytsky Uprising. Shortly after Treaty of Zboriv, in 1649, the regiment was disbanded. The regiments sotnias were all transferred to Chernihiv Regiment.

The regiment was reactivated in 1654 as part of preparations for Invasion of the Polish–Lithuanian Commonwealth, with colonel Petro Zabila becoming commander once again. The regiment tok part in third siege of Bykhaw in October 1654. Zabila was replaced as colonel of the regiment by Samiilo Kurbatskyi in 1655. After its abolishment in 1655, all of the sotnias were transferred to Nizhyn Regiment.

Structure
The regiment comprised 9 sotnias during 1648-1649:
 Borzna
 Ivanhorod
 Syvolozh
 Bakhmach
 Olenivka
 Baturyn
 Konotop
 Korop
 Hlukhiv

The regiment comprised 5 sotnias during 1654-1655:
 Borzna 1
 Borzna 2
 Bakhmach
 Kustovka
 Nove Misto

Commanders
All commanders were Colonels.
Petro Zabila 1648-1649, 1654-1655
Samiilo Kurbatskyi 1655

References

Sources 

Cossack Hetmanate Regiments
History of Chernihiv Oblast